Gillian Clarke (born 8 June 1937) is a Welsh poet and playwright, who also edits, broadcasts, lectures and translates from Welsh into English. She co-founded Tŷ Newydd, a writers' centre in North Wales.

Life

Gillian Clarke was born on 8 June 1937 in Cardiff. She was brought up in Cardiff and Penarth, though for part of the Second World War she was in Pembrokeshire. She lived in Barry for a few years, at a house called Flatholme in The Parade. Although her parents were Welsh speakers, she was brought up to speak only English and learnt to speak Welsh as an adult – partly as a form of rebellion. She graduated in English from Cardiff University.

Career
After university Clarke spent a year working for the BBC in London. She then returned to Cardiff, where she gave birth to her daughter, Catrin, and two sons. About Catrin she wrote a poem under her name. Clarke worked as an English teacher, first at the Reardon-Smith Nautical College and later at Newport College of Art.

In the mid-1980s she moved to rural Ceredigion, West Wales, with her second husband, after which she spent some years teaching creative writing at the University of Glamorgan. In 1990 she was a co-founder of Tŷ Newydd, a writers' centre in North Wales.

Her poetry is studied by GCSE and A Level students throughout the United Kingdom. A considerable number of her poems are used in the GCSE AQA Anthology. She has given poetry readings and lectures in Europe and the United States; her work has been translated into ten languages. Some of her English poems were translated into Chinese by Peter Jingcheng Xu and published in the journal Foreign Literature and Art (Issue 6, December 2016).

Clarke has published numerous collections of poetry for adults and children (see below), as well as dramatic commissions and numerous articles in a wide range of publications. She is a former editor of The Anglo-Welsh Review (1975–84) and the current president of Tŷ Newydd. Several of her books have received a Poetry Book Society Recommendation. In 1999 Gillian Clarke received the Glyndŵr Award for an "Outstanding Contribution to the Arts in Wales" during the Machynlleth Festival. She was on the judging panel for the 2008 Manchester Poetry Prize. Clarke reads her poetry for teenagers who are taking their English GCSE school exams. She is part of the GCSE Poetry Live team that also includes John Agard, Simon Armitage, Carol Ann Duffy, Imtiaz Dharker, Moniza Alvi, Grace Nichols, Daljit Nagra and Choman Hardi.

In December 2013 Clarke was the guest on BBC Radio 4's Desert Island Discs. She has written over 100 poems during her career.

Awards
In 2008, Gillian Clarke became the third National Poet of Wales. She held the post until 2016, when she was succeeded by Ifor ap Glyn. In 2010 she was awarded the Queen's Gold Medal for Poetry and became the second Welsh person to receive the honour.

In 2011 Clarke joined the Gorsedd of Bards. In 2012 she received the Wilfred Owen Association Poetry award.

The book Ice was shortlisted for the T. S. Eliot Prize in 2012.

Books
Snow on the Mountain. (Christopher Davies), 1971
The Sundial. (Gomer Press / Gwasg Gomer), 1978 
Letter From a Far Country. (Carcanet Press), 1982
Selected Poems. (Carcanet Press), 1985 
Letting in the Rumour. (Carcanet Press), 1989 
The King of Britain's Daughter. (Carcanet Press), 1993 
Collected Poems. (Carcanet Press), 1997 
Five Fields. (Carcanet Press), 1998 
The Animal Wall. Illustrated, for children. (Gomer Press / Gwasg Gomer) 1999 
Nine Green Gardens. (Gomer Press / Gwasg Gomer), 2000 
Owain Glyndŵr. (National Library of Wales), 2000 
Making the Beds for the Dead (Carcanet Press) April 2004 
At the Source (Carcanet Press) May 2008 
A Recipe for Water (Carcanet Press) April 2009 
Ice (Carcanet Press October 2012) 
Zoology (Carcanet Press July 2019)  
Roots Home: Essays and a Journal (Carcanet Press March 2021) 
The Hours (Broken Sleep Books April 2021)  (limited to 100)

See also
Anglo-Welsh poetry

References

External links

Profile at Poetry Archive with poems written and audio 
"The poet talks about her prose collection At the Source", BBC Woman's Hour, 13 May 2008 (audio, 10 mins) 
"Making Beds for the Dead", BBC Woman's Hour, 8 April 2004 (audio, 10 mins) 
Carcanet Press
Review of Gillian Clarke in the Guardian
Gillian Clarke poetry workshop in the Guardian
Gillian Clarke poetry translated into Chinese in Foreign Literature and Art

1937 births
20th-century Welsh educators
20th-century women educators
20th-century Welsh poets
21st-century Welsh poets
20th-century Welsh women writers
21st-century Welsh women writers
21st-century Welsh writers
Anglo-Welsh women poets
Alumni of Cardiff University
Academics of the University of Glamorgan
Fellows of the Royal Society of Literature
Living people
Writers from Cardiff
Bards of the Gorsedd
Welsh–English translators
BBC people
Welsh magazine editors
Women magazine editors